Gal'ed (lit. Monument) is a kibbutz in northern Israel. Located in the Menashe Heights with an area of 14,500 dunams, it falls under the jurisdiction of Megiddo Regional Council.

History
Kibbutz Gal'ed was established in 1945 by a gar'in of German HaBonim members which had formed in 1938. Because the land on which the kibbutz lies was bought with money Yitzhak Ochberg, a South African philanthropist, had given, the Keren HaYesod wanted the kibbutz named Even Yitzhak (lit. Stone of Yitzhak), but eventually the kibbutz had its way: the kibbutz is named Gal'ed in memory of the HaBonim members killed in World War II – established on the tract of land "Even Yitzhak." The land had traditionally belonged to the Palestinian village of Al-Butaymat, which became depopulated in 1948. 

Amongst the founders were the couple Giora and Senetta Yoseftal, both of whom were later members of the Knesset, with Giora serving in several ministerial portfolios.

References

Kibbutzim
Kibbutz Movement
Populated places established in 1945
Populated places in Northern District (Israel)
1945 establishments in Mandatory Palestine
German-Jewish culture in Israel